Shaffer Chimere Smith (born October 18, 1979), known professionally as Ne-Yo, is an American singer, songwriter, actor, dancer, and record producer. He gained fame for his songwriting abilities when he penned Mario's 2004 hit "Let Me Love You". The single's successful release prompted a meeting between Ne-Yo and Def Jam's then-president Jay-Z, resulting in a long-tenured recording contract. He is a recipient of several awards including three Grammy Awards.

Ne-Yo's debut solo single, "Stay" (featuring Peedi Peedi), was released in 2005 to moderate success. His debut studio album, In My Own Words (2006), was critically and commercially successful, reaching number one on the Billboard 200 chart in the United States. It is certified platinum in the United States, United Kingdom, Japan and Australia and saw the success of the single "So Sick", which topped the Billboard Hot 100 chart in the United States.

Because of You (2007), Ne-Yo's second studio album, was the second number one platinum-selling album debuted on the Billboard 200 and Top R&B/Hip-Hop Albums charts, and received the Grammy Award for Best Contemporary R&B Album at the 50th Grammy Awards. His third studio album, Year of the Gentleman (2008), saw continued success and further Grammy Award nominations for Best Contemporary R&B Album as well as Album of the Year. Its singles "Closer" and "Miss Independent" were also nominated for the Grammy Award for Best Male Pop Vocal Performance, Best Male R&B Vocal Performance, and Best R&B Song. Year of the Gentleman has been certified platinum twice in the US, selling two million copies, also platinum three times in the UK and once in Japan.

Libra Scale (2010), Ne-Yo's fourth studio album, reached number one in the UK R&B Singles and Albums Charts and number nine on the US Billboard 200, seeing a decline in overall sales. His fifth studio album, R.E.D. (2012), saw the international success of its lead single "Let Me Love You (Until You Learn to Love Yourself)", which certified platinum in the United States, became Ne-Yo's fifth chart-topping song in the United Kingdom, and sold over two million copies. Ne-Yo's sixth studio album, Non-Fiction, followed in 2015. His seventh studio album, Good Man, was released on June 8, 2018. In addition to music, Ne-Yo served as judge for the reality competition series World of Dance from 2017 to 2020 alongside Jennifer Lopez and Derek Hough. In 2021, Ne-Yo competed as Badger on the second season of The Masked Singer UK, and finished in second place. His ninth studio album, Self Explanatory, was released on July 15, 2022.

Early life 
Shaffer Chimere Smith was born in Camden, Arkansas. His father is of African American and Chinese descent, while his mother is African American. Both of his parents were musicians. As a young child, he was raised by his mother after she separated from his father. His mother then relocated the family to Las Vegas, Nevada. 

While in the Las Vegas Academy, Smith adopted the stage name GoGo and joined an R&B group called Envy, who appeared during amateur night on Showtime at the Apollo and on the short lived MTV series The Cut (hosted by Lisa "Left Eye" Lopes of TLC). The group disbanded in 2000, and Smith continued to write songs for other artists before starting his solo career. The stage name Ne-Yo was coined by Big D Evans, a producer with whom Ne-Yo once worked, because Evans claimed that Ne-Yo sees music like the character Neo sees the Matrix.

Music career

1998–2005: Career beginnings 

After Envy disbanded in 2000, Columbia Records signed Ne-Yo, but the label dropped him before he could release his already-recorded first album. American singer Marques Houston happened to hear "That Girl", which Ne-Yo had planned to release as his debut single from his then-unreleased album. Houston re-recorded the song and released it as a single for his 2003 album MH. The release of the song led to Ne-Yo being recognized as a top songwriter.

For the next two years, Ne-Yo continued writing songs, some of which have not been officially released. He contributed songs to American singer Teedra Moses's 2004 album Complex Simplicity, Christina Milian's It's About Time, and the American boy band Youngstown, none of which, however, brought Ne-Yo much mainstream attention. Ne-Yo has also contributed songs to singers Mary J. Blige, B2K, Faith Evans, and Musiq, among others.

A breakthrough came when Ne-Yo wrote "Let Me Love You" for American singer Mario. The song reached number one on the Billboard Hot 100, and later stayed at the top spot for nine weeks. After the successful release, Tina Davis, former A&R representative for Def Jam Recordings, arranged an informal meeting with label head L.A. Reid. Despite not seeking a new contract at the time, then-CEO of Def Jam Jay-Z signed Ne-Yo to a new deal after he performed for the label's executives.

2006–2007: In My Own Words and Because of You 

In early 2006, Ne-Yo released his debut album, In My Own Words, through Def Jam. Boosted by its popular second single "So Sick", the album debuted at number one on Billboard 200, selling over 301,000 copies in its first week on sale. During the same week, the single had reached number one on the Billboard Hot 100. Later singles released were "When You're Mad" and "Sexy Love", which peaked at number 15 and number seven, respectively. The album has been certified platinum by the Recording Industry Association of America (RIAA) for a shipment of over one million units.

His second album, Because of You, was released on May 1, 2007, and, fueled by its lead single, debuted at number one on the Billboard 200, selling 251,000 copies in the United States; the feat gave Ne-Yo his second number-one album. The first single from the platinum-selling album was the title track, which peaked at the number-two spot. Despite the success of "Because of You", later singles released charted lower and were unable to reach the Top 20. The album has been certified platinum by RIAA for a shipment of over one million units. In December 2007, Ne-Yo and the Goo Goo Dolls performed at a fund-raising concert for the then–presidential candidate Senator Barack Obama.

2008–2010: Year of the Gentleman and Libra Scale 
Ne-Yo's third album, Year of the Gentleman, was released internationally on August 5, 2008. Speaking to noted UK R&B writer Pete Lewis of the award-winning Blues & Soul, Ne-Yo explained the thinking behind its title: "To me Year of the Gentleman is all about a persona, a swag and a charm. I made an assessment of the music business. And, in my personal opinion, the essence of the gentleman is absent right now. Everybody kinda looks the same, everybody's kinda doing the same thing, everybody's kinda rude and full of themselves. Whereas a gentleman is calm, courteous, kind, charming... So that title basically represents me trying to lead by example, and showing these cats what it is to be a gentleman in this business still."

The album sold 250,000 copies in its first week in the United States, debuting on the Billboard 200 at number two. Reviews for the album were positive: in one, Caryn Ganz of Rolling Stone magazine wrote that Year of the Gentleman is "actually a superb concept album about what a great boyfriend he [Ne-Yo] can be".

The first two singles, "Closer" and "Miss Independent", peaked at number seven on the Billboard Hot 100. The album was nominated for Best Contemporary R&B Album and Album of the Year at the 2009 Grammy Awards, "Closer" for Best Male Pop Vocal Performance, and "Miss Independent" for Best Male R&B Vocal Performance and Best R&B Song. Year of the Gentleman has been certified platinum by RIAA for a shipment of more than one million copies. The third single, "Mad", peaked at number 11 on the Billboard Hot 100.

On August 12, 2008, the New Kids on the Block released "Single", the second single from their fifth studio album, The Block, which is a duet with Ne-Yo. Ne-Yo included a solo version of the song on his album Year of the Gentleman.

In December 2008, Ne-Yo performed at the Kennedy Center Honors as part of the tribute to Barbra Streisand; he sang and danced to the song "Lover Come Back to Me", which Streisand recorded on her second album in 1963.

In 2009, Billboard ranked him as the 57th Artist of the 2000s decade.

On September 2, 2009, Ne-Yo released greatest hits album Ne-Yo: The Collection in Japan. The album was also released with a limited edition CD+DVD edition complete with the music videos of singles. It debuted at number four on Japan's Oricon weekly albums chart, selling 55,625 copies in the first week.

In January 2010, Ne-Yo was featured in a duet with singer Mariah Carey titled "Angels Cry".

In June 2010, Ne-Yo released the single "Beautiful Monster", which became Ne-Yo's third number-one single on the UK Singles Chart. It peaked at number 53 on the Billboard Hot 100 chart.

On October 8, 2010, Ne-Yo performed some of his songs from the new album at P.C. Richard & Son Theater in New York City, an event hosted by iHeartRadio. Ne-Yo made an appearance at New York ComicCon to announce that he was collaborating with Stan Lee for a Libra Scale comic. Ne-Yo also met with fans for pictures and autographs in the Cultyard of the ComicCon. The second and third singles released from the album are "Champagne Life" and "One in a Million", respectively.

Libra Scale was released on November 22, 2010. It received critical acclaim from music critics, but was a commercial disappointment, debuting at number nine on the US Billboard 200 chart, selling less than all of his previous three studio albums. Ne-Yo stated: "The album is based upon this short story which basically follows these three characters who are forced to choose between money-power-and-fame versus love. Which in turn is why I've called it 'Libra Scale'. You know, its whole concept is based on that question of morality – that, if you weighed it all out on a libra scale, which one of those two options would you choose?". Libra Scale sold 112,000 copies in its first week. In the United Kingdom, the album debuted at number 11 on the UK Albums Chart, while debuting at number one on the UK R&B Chart.

2011–2012: R.E.D. 

On February 25, 2011, while on his tour in the United Kingdom, he announced his new album would be called Love and Passion and would be released in September, but this was proven false as the title was tentative. American rapper Fabolous said in an interview that he is planning a collaboration album with Ne-Yo as well. Ne-Yo has also written songs for Mary J. Blige, JB, Beyoncé, Monica, Alexandra Burke, Cheryl Cole, and Willow Smith's upcoming albums. Ne-Yo starred in two motion pictures, the long-gestating George Lucas project Red Tails, released in early 2012, and Battle: Los Angeles, which was released in the United States on March 11, 2011. Ne-Yo has already finished writing songs for American singer and Roc Nation artist Alexis Jordan and her self-titled debut album as well as Jennifer Hudson for her second studio album, I Remember Me, which had a North American release on March 22, 2011. Ne-Yo appeared in the children's preschool show The Fresh Beat Band and was one of the few artists not to cancel appearances in the wake of the 2011 Japan earthquake.

In the spring of 2011, Ne-Yo featured alongside Nayer and Afrojack on Pitbull's single "Give Me Everything", which peaked at number one on the Billboard Hot 100, giving Ne-Yo his second US number-one single, his first since 2006's "So Sick" and his first as a guest artist. Ne-Yo also revealed in an interview that he would like to collaborate with Chris Brown, Lil Wayne, and Drake on his upcoming album.

In January 2012, it was reported that Ne-Yo, along with his label imprint Compound Entertainment, had moved from Def Jam Recordings to Motown Records. He was also appointed Senior Vice President of A&R of Motown, where he would serve "...as a producer and mentor to the label's artists, as well as seeking out and signing new talent to the label." Ne-Yo was slated to release his fifth studio album, R.E.D. (as in "Realizing Every Dream"), on September 18, 2012. The album was initially titled The Cracks in Mr. Perfect. The album's first official single, "Lazy Love", was released on June 12, 2012, and peaked at number forty-two on the US Hot R&B/Hip-Hop Songs chart. "Let Me Love You (Until You Learn to Love Yourself)", co-written by Australian singer-songwriter Sia, was released as the second single on July 31, 2012. The song peaked at number seven on the Billboard Hot 100 and became Ne-Yo's fifth number-one song in the United Kingdom. Because of Kevin McCall's new album and the song Ne-Yo will be in, "Love Time", was not yet released because he and his friend Chris Brown will make an appearance on Ne-Yo's R.E.D. album in the song called "What I Do", which they all will be involved in writing the beat says Ne-Yo, who was interviewed by TMZ in New York. "I expect this to be a banger in clubs for the slow songs and to get Ne-Yo his first top 10 song in years," said Chris Brown, after a celebrity basketball game with Ne-Yo, Kevin Hart, and other celebrities in the month of July.

On August 29, 2012, Ne-Yo was one of the headliners alongside R&B recording artist Melanie Fiona, in the Summer Beats Concert Series, otherwise known as the MJ Birthday Concert, which was on what would have been the 54th birthday of the late American pop icon Michael Jackson which was sponsored by and live-streamed by Pepsi and Billboard. He performed a medley of hits, as well as performing "The Way You Make Me Feel", "Smooth Criminal" and "I Just Can't Stop Loving You" from Jackson's best-selling 1987 album, Bad, in preparation for the reissue of Bad 25 on September 18, 2012. The concert took place at Gotham Hall in New York City. R.E.D. was released in the United Kingdom on November 5, and in North America on November 6, 2012. On December 8, 2012, Ne-Yo was the musical guest for Saturday Night Live with Jamie Foxx guest-hosting for that week.

In 2012, Ne-Yo was awarded the Hal David Starlight Award of the Songwriter's Hall of Fame which honors gifted songwriters who are at an apex in their careers and are making a significant impact in the music industry via their original songs.

2013–2019: Non-Fiction and Good Man 

In March 2013, Ne-Yo collaborated with Akon on David Guetta's single "Play Hard", from his 2012 album Nothing but the Beat 2.0. He also collaborated with Jessica Sanchez on her single "Tonight" from her debut album Me, You & the Music. The single, along with the music video was released on March 21, 2013. In April, Ne-Yo and Cher Lloyd collaborated on their single "It's All Good", which eventually was featured on Fruttare commercials. Around the same time, he and Celine Dion recorded "Incredible" for Dion's 2013 album Loved Me Back to Life. "Incredible" was released as a single in February 2014 and the music video premiered in June 2014.

On May 29, 2014, Ne-Yo announced his upcoming sixth studio album would be called Non-Fiction. That same day, he announced a new single, "Money Can't Buy". On September 16, 2014, the lead single from "Non Fiction" was sent to mainstream radio titled "She Knows" featuring Juicy J. A few months later, Ne-Yo announced that the new release date for Non-Fiction was January 27, 2015. The album included collaborations with Pitbull and Charisse Mills. The album peaked at number five on the Billboard 200 chart.

In July 2015, Ne-Yo collaborated with Dimitri Vegas & Like Mike on a new song for the Tomorrowland anthem titled "Higher Place". In 2016, Ne-Yo collaborated with Yunel and J Alvarez for their single entitled "Sin Miedo", released on November 12, 2016, and with Diamond Platnumz for their single entitled "Marry You", released on February 2, 2017.

On May 8, 2017, Ne-Yo released a single "Earn Your Love" from his forthcoming seventh album, whilst announcing that the album is slated for a release in 2017. A new single, "Another Love Song" was released on May 30, 2017. In July 2017, he made a cameo in the comedy film Girls Trip, starring Queen Latifah, Jada Pinkett Smith, and Regina Hall.

2020-present: New music and The Masked Singer 
On March 27, 2020, Ne-Yo collaborated with Jamaican dancehall singer Charly Black for a new single, Over Again.

From 2020 to 2021, Ne-Yo competed as Badger in the second season of the British version of The Masked Singer. He finished as the runner-up to Joss Stone. He also confirmed that his next album, previously titled Sweet Escape had been renamed Self Explanatory. It was released on Motown Records on July 15, 2022.

Artistry

Musical style and influences 

Ne-Yo's music is generally R&B, while he also incorporates pop and hip hop occasionally. His musical influences include Michael Jackson, Luther Vandross, Babyface, Blackstreet, and Usher. Ne-Yo is noted for his tenor voice, including his application of falsetto in his works.

Songwriting and production 
Ne-Yo frequently co-writes with Tor Erik Hermansen and Mikkel S. Eriksen of the Norwegian production team Stargate. Ne-Yo met them in a hallway at Sony Music Studios in New York, and knowing the team produced R&B records, decided to collaborate with them. The collective's early works were tracks from In My Own Words, including "So Sick".

Aside from working on his own album, Ne-Yo also collaborates with several other artists. His works include: Rihanna's top-ten singles "Unfaithful", "Russian Roulette", and her number-one hit "Take a Bow", Mario Vazquez's "Gallery", Paula DeAnda's "Walk Away (Remember Me)", and Beyoncé Knowles' Billboard Hot 100 number-one single "Irreplaceable", which stayed at the top of the chart for ten consecutive weeks. He wrote the song "I'm You" for Leona Lewis's debut album Spirit, and is currently writing songs for her next album and for the debut album of fellow X Factor winner Alexandra Burke. He has also been working with Sugababes for their seventh album, with member Keisha Buchanan confirming that Ne-Yo had written a song called "No More You" for their album.

In 2010, he dueted with Mariah Carey on "Angel's Cry", a song for her cancelled album, Angels Advocate. Ne-Yo has also written songs for Celine Dion, Whitney Houston, Carrie Underwood, Anastacia, Ciara, Corbin Bleu, Enrique Iglesias, and Dima Bilan. He collaborated with Lindsay Lohan on her new material, having already finished "Bossy", a pre-single for her new album Spirit in the Dark. In 2007, Ne-Yo confirmed that he had been contacted by producer will.i.am to work on what would have been Michael Jackson's new album. However, at the time of Jackson's death, Ne-Yo's collaborations with him had yet to move past the writing stage. In an interview in 2010, Ne-Yo said that, since Jackson's death, he had been confused as what to do with the songs, as he felt that selling them to another artist or even releasing the songs himself would be disrespectful to Jackson's legacy. In 2009, he wrote "Truth (Saigo no Shinjitsu)" forthe Japanese pop group w-inds.

Ne-Yo ventured out to open his own recording studio, called Carrington House, in Atlanta, Georgia. He also had started his own production company, Compound Entertainment, in 2007, and has hired several producers and songwriters in hopes of turning it into a full-fledged record label. It successfully became a label, and artists such as RaVaughn, Paula Campbell, Sixx John, Adrienne Bailon and Shanell are now associated with Compound.

Other ventures

Television 
In 2011, Ne-Yo was approached by Cartoon Network to help create an animated series. Ne-Yo announced that the show would be titled I Heart Tuesday and that he had created it for his sister. He also stated that he wanted to avoid having the show resemble the anime art style of The Boondocks due to the potential cost of the show's animation style.

Ne-Yo appeared in an episode of the seventh season of CSI: NY as a hit-man, under his birth name of Shaffer Smith.

In 2011, Ne-Yo appeared in an episode of The Fresh Beat Band as himself.

He starred as the Tin Man in NBC's musical telecast adaptation of The Wiz alongside David Alan Grier, Elijah Kelley, Queen Latifah, Common, Amber Riley, Uzo Aduba and Mary J. Blige. The musical telecast premiered December 3, 2015 as a three-hour event. For his performance, he received a Critics' Choice Award nomination for Best Supporting Actor in a Movie made for Television or Limited Series. In May 2018, he took part in the Celebrity Ninja Warrior special for Red Nose Day. He completed the course, resulting in a $30,000 donation.

In December 2018, he was the entertainment at 67th Miss Universe pageant where he performed during the final catwalk.

In 2021, Ne-Yo competed as "Badger" on the second season of the British version of The Masked Singer and finished in second place.

Philanthropy 
Ne-Yo is passionate about the arts and children and has shown his support for Little Kids Rock by filming a PSA for the organization.

Personal life

Family 
In 2005, Jesseca White, Ne-Yo's girlfriend at the time, gave birth to a boy, naming him Chimere after Ne-Yo's middle name. Though Ne-Yo believed he was the father, he later discovered the child was not his.

In June 2010, Ne-Yo told Ebony that he and his then-girlfriend, Monyetta Shaw, were expecting their first child together – a girl due early in 2011. Shaw gave birth prematurely to daughter Madilyn Grace Smith on November 12, 2010, in Atlanta, Georgia. Announcing the birth, Ne-Yo said of his first child, "I've been in love before but this feels like nothing I've ever felt... like I'm in love for the first time."

In September 2011, Ne-Yo revealed that he was expecting his second child with Monyetta Shaw. Shaw gave birth to a boy, Mason Evan Smith, on October 9, 2011.

In September 2015, the singer announced that he and Crystal Renay Williams were engaged and expecting a child. They were married on February 20, 2016. Their son, Shaffer Chimere Smith Jr., was born on March 15, 2016. Their second son, Roman Alexander-Raj Smith was born on June 14, 2018. In February 2020, Ne-Yo announced that he and Crystal Smith would end their marriage, and he withdrew his divorce case afterwards. The pair reconciled during the 2020 coronavirus pandemic, with Ne-Yo telling CBS chat show The Talk: "Before the quarantine happened, we were definitely talking divorce, and the quarantine forced us to sit still, block out the noise from the world - you know the world can get very, very loud, and we tend to let the world's opinion mean more in certain situations than it should." 

In February 2021, Ne-Yo announced via Instagram that he and Williams were expecting a third child together. On June 25, 2021, Ne-Yo and his wife welcomed their third child Isabella Rose Smith.

In April 2022, the couple remarried in a Las Vegas ceremony. In August 2022, Smith filed for divorce, with allegations of infidelity throughout their marriage. 

In 2019, in wake of the television documentary, Surviving R. Kelly, Ne-Yo confirmed his support for the Mute R. Kelly campaign, for the protection of his own daughter.

On January 26, 2023, Ne-Yo and Crystal Renay finalized their divorce.

Legal issues 
On February 19, 2008, Ne-Yo was arrested for reckless driving and driving without a valid license after driving through Cobb County, Georgia in his 2006 Range Rover. It was reported that he was doing about 150 mph, 100 mph over the speed limit. On June 2, 2008, Ne-Yo pleaded guilty to the driving without a valid license charge and no contest to the reckless driving charge. He was sentenced to 24 hours of community service. On August 22, 2011, Ne-Yo was sued along with rapper Pitbull and DJ Afrojack by actress Lindsay Lohan, claiming that their song "Give Me Everything" referenced her by name in the lyrics. A judge ruled that Pitbull's use of her name was protected by the First Amendment and that Lohan was barely mentioned in the song. Pitbull then won the lawsuit.

Health 
In August 2017, Ne-Yo announced he had adopted a vegan diet after viewing the documentary What the Health. In February 2019, he said in an interview that he had lost "like 30 pounds" and had also reversed his tendinitis since he became vegan, calling it "one of the best things he's ever done". However, his representative confirmed in March 2020 that he was no longer a vegan.

Discography 

Studio albums
 In My Own Words (2006)
 Because of You (2007)
 Year of the Gentleman (2008)
 Libra Scale  (2010)
 R.E.D. (2012)
 Non-Fiction (2015)
 Good Man (2018)
 Another Kind of Christmas (2019)
 Self Explanatory (2022)

Filmography

Film

Television

Awards and nominations

References

External links 

 
 

 
1979 births
Living people
21st-century American male actors
21st-century American singers
African-American Christians
African-American male actors
African-American male dancers
African-American male singers
African-American record producers
American contemporary R&B singers
American dance musicians
American hip hop record producers
American hip hop singers
American male dancers
American male pop singers
American male singers
American male television actors
American people of Chinese descent
American philanthropists
American soul singers
American tenors
Def Jam Recordings artists
Grammy Award winners
Judges in American reality television series
Male actors from Arkansas
Male actors from Las Vegas
Midwest hip hop musicians
Motown artists
Musicians from Las Vegas
People from Camden, Arkansas
People from the Las Vegas Valley
Record producers from Arkansas
Record producers from Nevada
Singers from Arkansas
Singers from Nevada
Songwriters from Arkansas
Songwriters from Nevada